Semra is a village in Gopalganj district (near Thawe) of Bihar state, India. Semra is located just West and North corner of Thawe (Famous for Durga Mandir). Semra is famous for Ramjanki temple And Kali Maa temple pashchim tola.

Villages in Gopalganj district, India